Christus may refer to:

 Christ (title)

People
 Petrus Christus (c. 1410s – c. 1475), Dutch painter
 Sir Christus (1978–2017), Finnish musician

Music
 Christus (Liszt), an oratorio
 Christus (Mendelssohn), an unfinished oratorio Op.97
 Christus (opera), by Anton Rubinstein
 Christus. Mysterium in a Prelude and Three Oratorios, by Felix Draeseke

Art
 Christus (statue), by Bertel Thorvaldsen
 Christus (Indianapolis), statue by unknown located in Indianapolis, Indiana

Other
 CHRISTUS Health, a nonprofit company

See also 
 Christos (disambiguation)
 Christo (name)
 Christa (disambiguation)
 Christ (disambiguation)